Rend may refer to:
 Rend, Iran
 Rend River
 Rend Lake
 Rend, a video game by Frostkeep Studios